Lasiocephalus ovatus is a terrestrial herb in the high Andes.

Distribution
Colombia (South America)
Ecuador (South America).

References

External links

Senecioneae